SporTV is a Brazilian pay television sports network owned by Canais Globo, part of Grupo Globo, launched in 1991. It is the most watched sports network in Brazil.

On January 18, 2013, were launched High-definition simulcasts of SporTV and SporTV 2. Before that, select events were broadcast in HD on sister channel Globosat HD (now Modo Viagem). In 2013, SporTV was the 3rd most watched channel on Brazilian pay television, the first among sports channels. SporTV 2 was the 19th, and SporTV 3 was the 39th most watched channel.

SporTV programming rights

Summer Olympic Games 
 Paris 2024
 LA 2028
 Brisbane 2032

Winter Olympic Games 
 Beijing 2022

Paralympic Games 
 Beijing 2022

FIFA World Cup 
 Qatar 2022

Association Football 
 Brasileirão Série A (two games per matchday, except Athletico Paranaense)
 Brasileirão Série B
 Copa do Brasil
 Supercopa do Brasil
 Campeonato Gaúcho
 Campeonato Pernambucano
 Campeonato Brasileiro Feminino A1
 Campeonato Brasileiro Feminino A2
 Campeonato Paulista Feminino
 UEFA Euro
 FIFA World Cup Qualification (CONMEBOL)
 FIFA World Cup Qualification (UEFA)
 FIFA Women's World Cup
 FIFA U-20 Women's World Cup
 FIFA U-17 Women's World Cup
 FIFA U-20 World Cup
 FIFA U-17 World Cup
 Campeonato Brasileiro U-20
 Campeonato Brasileiro U-17
 Copa do Brasil U-20
 Copa São Paulo de Futebol Júnior
 Taça Belo Horizonte de Juniores
 Copa RS de Futebol Júnior
 UEFA Nations League

Athletics 
 Diamond League
 World Championships in Athletics
 IAAF World Indoor Championships in Athletics
 IAAF World Junior Championships in Athletics

Basketball 
 NBA
 NBB

Beach Soccer 
 Mundialito de Clubes
 FIFA Beach Soccer World Cup

eSports 
 Campeonato Brasileiro de Counter-Strike
 Campeonato Brasileiro de League of Legends
 Campeonato Brasileiro de PUBG Mobile
 Intel Extreme Masters

Futsal 
 FIFA Futsal World Cup
 Grand Prix de Futsal
 UEFA Futsal Championship

Clubs
 Liga Nacional de Futsal
 Women's Futsal Intercontinental Cup

Gymnastics 
 World Artistic Gymnastics Championships
 Artistic Gymnastics World Cup
 World Rhythmic Gymnastics Championships
 Trampoline World Championships

Handball 
 World Men's Handball Championship
 World Women's Handball Championship
 Liga Nacional de Handebol Masculino
 Liga Nacional de Handebol Feminino

Judo 
 World Judo Championships
 World Judo Tour

Karate 
 Karate Combat

Kickboxing 
 Glory

MMA - Mixed Martial Arts 
 Jungle Fight
 Eagle FC
 ONE Championship
 KSW
 Attack Fight

Motorsport 
 Stock Car Pro Series
 Porsche Cup Brasil
 Copa Truck
 Extreme E
 W Series
 Arena Cross
 Spanish Superbike Championship
 World Supercross Championship

Skateboarding 
 Street League Skateboarding

Tennis 
 Wimbledon
 US Open
 Roland Garros
 Billie Jean King Cup
 Rio Open
 ATP Challenger Tour

Volleyball 
 FIVB Volleyball Men's World Championship
 FIVB Volleyball Women's World Championship
 FIVB Volleyball Men's World Cup
 FIVB Volleyball Women's World Cup
 FIVB Volleyball Men's Nations League
 FIVB Volleyball Women's Nations League
 FIVB Volleyball World Grand Champions Cup
 South American Men's Volleyball Championship
 South American Women's Volleyball Championship

Clubs
 FIVB Volleyball Men's Club World Championship
 South American Men's Club Volleyball Championship
 South American Women's Club Volleyball Championship
 Superliga Masculina de Vôlei
 Superliga Feminina de Vôlei
 Copa Brasil Masculina de Vôlei
 Copa Brasil Feminina de Vôlei
 Campeonato Paulista Masculino de Vôlei
 Campeonato Paulista Feminina de Vôlei
 Campeonato Carioca Masculino de Vôlei
 Campeonato Carioca Feminina de Vôlei
 Supercopa Brasileira Masculina de Vôlei
 Supercopa Brasileira Feminina de Vôlei

Beach Volleyball
 FIVB Beach Volleyball World Championships
 FIVB Beach Volleyball World Tour
 Circuito Brasileiro de Vôlei de Praia

Winter Sports 
Alpine skiing
 FIS Alpine World Ski Championships

Biathlon
 Biathlon World Championships

Bobsleigh and skeleton
 FIBT World Championships

Curling
 World Men's Curling Championship
 World Women's Curling Championship

Figure skating
 World Figure Skating Championships

Nordic skiing
 FIS Nordic World Ski Championships

Snowboarding
 FIS Snowboarding World Championships

Other major events 
 World Aquatics Championships
 World Fencing Championships
 World Modern Pentathlon Championships
 World Rowing Championships
 World Weightlifting Championships

Special events 
 The Best FIFA Football Awards
 Laureus Awards
 Prêmio Brasil Olímpico
 Prêmio Craque do Brasileirão
 Prêmio eSports Brasileiro

Programs broadcast by SporTV 
 Baú do Esporte
 Ça Va Paris
 Faixa Combate
 Faixa Olímpica
 Galeria SporTV
 Giro da Rodada
 Globo Esporte
 Na Ponta dos Dedos
 NBA Action
 Redação SporTV
 Seleção SporTV
 SporTV News
 Super Vôlei
 Tá na Área
 Tá On
 Troca de Passes

Team from SporTV

Announcers 
 André Rizek
 Camilla Carelli
 Cleber Machado
 Felipe Diniz
 Igor Rodrigues
 Luís Roberto
 Luiz Teixeira
 Marcelo Barreto
 Mariana Fontes
 Roger Flores

Narrators 
 Bernardo Edler
 Bruno Fonseca
 Cláudio Uchôa 
 Clayton Carvalho
 Daniel Pereira
 Eduardo Moreno
 Eusébio Resende
 Everaldo Marques
 Gustavo Villani
 Henrique Guidi
 Jader Rocha
 Jaime Junior
 Júlio Oliveira
 Luiz Carlos Junior
 Luiz Felipe Prota
 Márcio Meneghini
 Milton Leite
 Natália Lara
 Odinei Ribeiro
 Rembrandt Junior
 Renata Silveira
 Rhoodes Lima
 Rogério Corrêia
 Sergio Arenillas
 Vinicius Rodrigues

Color Analysts

Football 
 Paulo César Vasconcellos
 Mauricio Noriega
 Lédio Carmona
 Paulo Nunes
 André Loffredo
 Sergio Xavier
 Grafite
 Pedrinho
 Fábio Júnior
 Henrique Fernandes
 Mauricio Saraiva
 Ricardinho
 Richarlyson
 Ana Thais Matos
 Renata Mendonça
 Ricardo Gonzalez
 Roger Flores
 Carlos Eduardo Lino
 Carlos Eduardo Mansur
 Alexandre Lozetti
 Fabíola Andrade
 Martin Fernandez
 Caio Ribeiro
 Júnior
 Conrado Santana
 Marcelo Raed
 Fabíola Andrade
 Gustavo Castelucci
 Cabral Neto
 Salvio Spinola Fagundes Filho
 Paulo César de Oliveira
 Sandro Meira Ricci
 Fernanda Colombo
 Janette Arcanjo
 Alline Calandrini

Other Sports 
 Domingos Venâncio (Tennis)
 Ricardo Acioly (Tennis)
 Narck Rodrigues (Tennis)
 Rafael Lopes (Motor Sports)
 Luciano Burti (Motor Sports)
 Marco Freitas (Volleyball)
 Fabi (Volleyball)
 Carlão (Volleyball)
 Nalbert (Volleyball)
 Robson da Silva (Athletics)
 Luciano Andrade (Mixed Martial Arts)
 Daniel Fucs (Boxing)
 Flávio Canto (Judo)
 Pedro Maia (Basketball)
 Marcelinho Machado (Basketball)
 Hortência (Basketball)
 Gustavo Borges (Swimming)
 Daiane dos Santos (Gymnastic)
 André Spinola (Winter Sports)
 Ana Hissa (Mixed Martial Arts)
 Marcelo Rodrigues (Futsal)
 Thiago Pereira (Swimming)
 Bruno Bocayuva (Surf)
 Claúdia Guimarães (Surf)
 Vitor Ribas (Surf)
 Bruna Tomaselli (Motor Sports)
 José Gaspar (Motor Sports)
 Geninho Amaral (Skateboarding)
 Helena Deyama (Motor Sports)
 Fabrício Werdum (Mixed Martial Arts)

See also 
 Canais Globo
 Grupo Globo

External links 
 SporTV official website

Portuguese-language television stations in Brazil
Television channels and stations established in 1991
Television stations in Brazil
Globosat
Mass media in Rio de Janeiro (city)
1991 establishments in Brazil
Sports television networks in Brazil
Prime Sports